Teleiodes pekunensis is a moth of the family Gelechiidae. It is found in South Korea and Japan.

The wingspan is 12.5-13.5 mm. Adults are identical to Telphusa necromantis and can only be distinguished by the genitalia of both sexes.

References

Moths described in 1993
Teleiodes